Georges Omer Pinault (28 March 1877 – 16 November 1951) was a French fencer. He competed in the men's masters sabre event at the 1900 Summer Olympics.

References

External links
 

1877 births
1951 deaths
French male sabre fencers
Olympic fencers of France
Fencers at the 1900 Summer Olympics
People from Nevers
Sportspeople from Nièvre